Allan Havis is an American playwright whose dramas have pronounced political themes and probe colliding cultures.  His works range from minimal-language texts to ambiguous, ironic narratives that delineate the genesis, paradoxes, and seduction of evil.  Several of his stories involve Jewish identity, cultural alienation, and universal problems of racism.  He has been influenced by August Strindberg and Harold Pinter.

In addition, Havis has written librettos for four operas produced in the early 21st century. He has authored two young adult novels, one adult novel, and a popular book on cult films. Since 2001, he has edited and published three anthologies of plays, selected to express the changing political landscape in the United States in the era of terrorism. He is a professor of playwriting at the University of California, San Diego.

Biography
Havis has an MFA from Yale Drama School  and is on the UC San Diego theatre faculty. For many years he has headed the MFA playwriting program at University of California, San Diego. He served as Provost of Thurgood Marshall College, UC San Diego from 2006 until 2016. He has two children.

Writing career
He has published nineteen plays in editions by Broadway Play Publishing Inc., Theatre Communications Group, Penguin/Mentor, Smith & Kraus, Applause Books, University of Illinois, and Southern Illinois University.

His book Cult Films: Taboo and Transgression ( University Press of America, 2008) covers ninety years of cinema. 
In addition to his plays, Havis wrote the novel Clear Blue Silence (Ktav Publishing, 2022), two novels for young adults, Albert the Astronomer (Harper & Row, 1979), and a sequel, Albert Down a Wormhole (Goodreads Press, 2019).

He has edited three anthologies of plays: American Political Plays (2001), published by University of Illinois Press; American Political Plays after 9/11 (2010), published by Southern Illinois University Press; and American Political Plays in the Age of Terrorism (2019), published by Bloomsbury/Methuen.

In addition, Havis has written librettos for operas. He adapted his play, Lilith (1990), to use as a libretto for an opera with music by Anthony Davis). The chamber opera highlights the mythical first woman to accompany Adam in the Garden of Eden, who was thought to have had demonic, supernatural power; she is reimagined in a modern era. The world premiere concert recital was at the Conrad Prebys Music Center, UC San Diego on December 4, 2009. Several excerpts of Lilith were given a showcase presentation and new production at the Qualcomm Institute, UC San Diego, in November 2015. This work can be see on UCSD TV online.

His second opera, also developed with composer Anthony Davis, explored a modern King Lear archetype, with a woman neuroscientist with Alzheimer's disease as the protagonist. Lear on the 2nd Floor had a showcase presentation at Princeton University's Lewis Center for the Arts in March 2012.  The opera was produced in March 2013 at Conrad Prebys Music Center, UC San Diego and in November 2022 at Eastman School of Music, Rochester, New York.

His third opera libretto, St. Francis de los Barrios, was given a showcase presentation at the Qualcomm Institute, UC San Diego in December 2017.  His fourth opera in collaboration with composer Michael Roth, The Golem of La Jolla had a concert recital at La Jolla Playhouse's 2019 WoW Festival.

Dramatic works 
 Hotel Stockholm (2020)
 The Golem of La Jolla (opera 2019)
 St. Francis de los Barrios (opera 2017)
 My Aunt Lucy (2017)
 Zeliha (2016)
 Babette (2015)
 The Hypnotist (2014)	
 Garments and Threads (2013)	
The Landlady (2012)

Awards 
 2008 San Diego Patté Award for Outstanding New Play, for The Tutor	
 2003, San Diego Theatre Critics Circle Award for New Play, Nuevo California 
 1987, Kennedy Center Award for New Plays, for Morocco
 1986 HBO's Playwrights USA Award, for Morocco
 1985 Foundation of the Dramatist Guild/CBS Award, for Morocco
 1987 Guggenheim Fellowship
 McKnight Fellowship
 Rockefeller Fellowship
 National Endowment for the Arts Fellowship
 California State Arts Fellowship
 New York State Arts Fellowship

References

External links 

 Allan Havis, UCSD Theatre Department
 Marshall College, UCSD
"Playwrights Process at Cygnet", Charlene and Brenda in the Blogosphere, October 1, 2013.

1951 births
Living people
20th-century American dramatists and playwrights
Yale School of Drama alumni
University of California, San Diego faculty
21st-century American dramatists and playwrights
American male dramatists and playwrights
American opera librettists
20th-century American male writers
21st-century American male writers